Rafał Leszczyński (1650–1703) from the Leszczyński family of Counts of the Holy Roman Empire, was a Polish nobleman (szlachcic), father of King of Poland Stanisław I Leszczyński.

Biography 
Rafał held the following noble positions:
Podstoli of the Crown in 1676
Stolnik of the Crown in 1677
Krajczy of the Crown in 1678
Great Chorąży of the Crown in 1683
Voivode of Kalisz Voivodeship on 1685
Voivode of Poznań Voivodeship in 1687
Voivode of Łęczyca Voivodeship and General Starost of Greater Poland in 1692
Grand Treasurer of the Crown in 1702
Starost of Wschowa, Mościska, Odolanów, Dubno and Nowy Dwór

1650 births
1703 deaths
Secular senators of the Polish–Lithuanian Commonwealth
Rafal
Polish people of German descent